Martten Kaldvee (born April 30, 1986 in Tallinn) is a former Estonian biathlete. At the 2010 Winter Olympics in Vancouver, he finished 74th in the 10 km sprint and 81st in the 20 km individual.

Citing a lack of funds and support from the Estonian biathlon team, Kaldvee retired from the sport after the 2009–10 season.

References

1986 births
Living people
Sportspeople from Tallinn
Estonian male biathletes
Biathletes at the 2010 Winter Olympics
Olympic biathletes of Estonia